Martin Glváč born 20 November 1967) is a Slovak politician for the Direction - Social Democracy. He was Minister of Defence in Fico's Second Cabinet from 2012 to 2016. and a Deputy Speaker of the National Council between 2016 and 2020. He did not run again in the 2020 Slovak parliamentary election.

In 2019, Glváč's communication with Marián Kočner, accused and later sentenced of serious crimes, and Kočner's close associate Alena Zsuzsová, who referred to Glváč as "Maznák" ("Cuddler") was leaked, leading to an end of Glváč's political career.

References

1967 births
Living people
Politicians from Bratislava
Comenius University alumni
Direction – Social Democracy politicians
Defence Ministers of Slovakia
Members of the National Council (Slovakia) 2010-2012
Members of the National Council (Slovakia) 2016-2020